Mitromorpha carpenteri, common name the filose turrid, is a species of sea snail, a marine gastropod mollusk in the family Mitromorphidae.

Description
Mitromorpha shells are of small size with a maximum length of ca.10 mm. Generally, their sculpture consists of spiral cords. The adult mitromorpha develops two columellar folds in which the posterior is often stronger.

Distribution
This species occurs in the Pacific Ocean off Ecuador and the Galapagos Islands. Fossils have been found in Quaternary striata of Mexico and California, USA; age range : 2.588 to 0.012 Ma.

References

 Mifsud C. (2001). The genus Mitromorpha Carpenter, 1865 (Neogastropoda, Turridae), and its sub-genera with notes on the European species. Published by the Author, Rabat, Malta 32 pp

External links
 
 

carpenteri
Gastropods described in 1954